Müzeyyen Senar (16 July 1918 – 8 February 2015) was a Turkish classical music performer, known as the "Diva of the Republic".

Early years
Müzeyyen Dombayoğlu was born in 1918 in the village of Gököz, in Keles district of Bursa Province, in the then Ottoman Empire. She had two elder brothers İsmet and Hilmi. Her mother Zehra used to sing Senar to sleep. At the age of five, she developed a stutter after returning from a wedding ceremony, which she thought was the result of fear, as she recalled. Her speech disorder lasted until adulthood, though, as is usually the case with performers, it did not affect her singing voice. At six years old, knowing most of the popular folk songs by heart, she sang at family gatherings and wedding ceremonies, to which her mother took her. In her early childhood, she ran away from her father's home in Bursa to Istanbul, where her mother lived. Her father had left his wife after a marriage of 25 years.

According to several claims by Turkish media, she was adopted by the Dombayoğlu family. She was born in the village of Hilmiye in İnegöl to ethnic Georgian parents. Her birth name was Zeliha Eren and her parents were Fatma and Reşit, who migrated from Batumi to İnegöl.

Career
Senar began her musical career in 1931, entering the Anadolu Musiki Cemiyeti ("Anatolia Musical Association") in Üsküdar, where she was educated by kemenche virtuoso Kemal Niyazi Seyhun and oud player Hayriye. After starting to perform at Radio Istanbul of TRT, she became well known. In 1933 she debuted on stage in a summer talent show at one of the most important music halls in Istanbul. She continued her performances at other renowned music halls. Also in 1933, aged 15, she sang her first song on 78 rpm record released by (His Master's Voice). More recordings followed later on Odeon Records and other labels. Her singing was also much admired by the founder of the Turkish Republic, Mustafa Kemal Atatürk (1881-1938). On several occasions she gave special concerts in his audience. 

Following an offer of Mesut Cemil in 1938, she went to Ankara to perform at the newly established state-owned local radio station. In 1941 she returned to Istanbul to give concerts at various well-known night clubs. In 1947, Senar gave her first concert abroad in Paris, France at Le Lido. With her voice and style, she opened a new era of Turkish classical music. She retired from active singing in 1983, appearing in her final show in a popular music hall in Bebek, Istanbul.

In the 1940s Senar played the leading role in the movie Kerem ile Aslı. In the 1960s she was featured in the movies Ana Yüreği and Sevgili Hocam. Her 1976 film, Analar Ölmez is autobiographical. She dubbed Egyptian singer Umm Kulthum's songs in imported Arabic movies with songs specially composed for Turkish release.

Later years and death
On 26 September 2006 it was reported that she suffered a cerebral infarction at her home in İzmir, which paralyzed her left side. In February 2008 it was reported that she had lost her voice. As of 2013, she was living with her daughter, Feraye Işıl, in Bodrum. Senar died on 8 February 2015, aged 96. She had been hospitalized with pneumonia at  Ege University Hospital in İzmir. On 10 February, she was laid to rest in Zincirlikuyu Cemetery, following the religious service held at Bebek Mosque in Istanbul.

Accolades
In 1998, she was awarded the State Artist Award, but she declined to accept it. With the initiative of her student, renowned Turkish classical music singer, Bülent Ersoy, an exhibition of photographs of her entitled "Cumhuriyetin Divası: Müzeyyen Senar" ("Müzeyyen Senar, the Diva of the Republic") was held in Ankara on 29 October 2009, the Republic Day of Turkey.

On 16 July 2018, Google celebrated her 100th birthday with a Google Doodle.

Discography

References

Further reading

External links
 

1918 births
2015 deaths
People from Keles
Turkish people of Georgian descent
20th-century Turkish women singers
Turkish classical singers
Turkish film actresses
Musicians of Ottoman classical music
Musicians of Turkish makam music
Burials at Zincirlikuyu Cemetery
Deaths from pneumonia in Turkey